Royston John Mastel CVO CBE (30 May 1917 – 7 April 1998) was a British police officer in the London Metropolitan Police.

Mastel was educated at Tottenham Grammar School and joined the Metropolitan Police as a Constable in 1937. He served as a pilot in the Royal Air Force Volunteer Reserve from 1941 to 1945, being commissioned from the rank of Flight Sergeant in May 1944 and promoted Flying Officer in November 1944. Rejoining the police, he was promoted Sergeant in 1946, Inspector in 1951, and Superintendent in 1955. In 1966 he was promoted Commander and made second-in-command of No.2 District. He was appointed Commander of the Order of the British Empire (CBE) in the 1969 Birthday Honours, having been promoted Deputy Assistant Commissioner (Personnel).

In 1972, he was appointed Assistant Commissioner "D" (Personnel and Training) and in October 1972 he took over as Assistant Commissioner "A" (Operations and Administration). He retired on 31 December 1976 and was appointed Commander of the Royal Victorian Order (CVO) in the 1977 Birthday Honours.

Footnotes

References
Biography, Who Was Who

1917 births
1998 deaths
People from Tottenham
Assistant Commissioners of Police of the Metropolis
Commanders of the Order of the British Empire
Commanders of the Royal Victorian Order
People educated at Tottenham Grammar School
Royal Air Force officers
Royal Air Force pilots of World War II
Royal Air Force Volunteer Reserve personnel of World War II